The women's pentathlon combined event at the 1972 Olympic Games took place on September 2 & 3.  The favorites going into the Olympics were Heide Rosendahl and Burglinde Pollak.  With Rosendahl narrowly defeating Pollack, by 24 points at the 1971 European Athletics Championships. The second event saw Mary Peters release a tremendous throw in the shot put catapulting her into lead, which she never relinquished.

Results

100m hurdles

Shot put

High jump
All heights in metres.

Long jump

200m

Final standings
Standings after Event 53 September 1972Legend:M = Mark, P = Points

Key:  WR = world record; OR = Olympic record; p = pass; x = fault; o = cleared; NM = no mark; DNF = did not finish; DNS = did not start; DQ = disqualified; T = tied

References

External links
Official report

Women's pentathlon
1972
1972 in women's athletics
Women's events at the 1972 Summer Olympics